The discography of American rapper Cassidy, consists of four studio albums, one compilation album, one extended play (EP), 12 mixtapes and 15 singles (including five as a featured artist).

Albums

Studio albums

Compilation albums

Mixtapes

EPs

Singles

As lead artist

As featured artist

Guest appearances

References

Hip hop discographies
Discographies of American artists